Asturias is a surname. Notable people with the surname include:

Enrique Antonio Degenhart Asturias, Guatemalan government minister
José Luis Asturias, Guatemalan chess master
Miguel Ángel Asturias (1899–1974), Guatemalan poet-diplomat, novelist, playwright, and journalist